= Lumendje =

Settlement in Democratic Republic of the Congo

Lumendje is a location in Bunyakiri Territory, South Kivu, Democratic Republic of the Congo.
